Costică is a Romanian male given name that may refer to:

Costică Acsinte
Costică Dafinoiu
Costică Olaru
Costică Toma

Romanian masculine given names